Minsei may refer to:

Politics
 The Democratic Youth League of Japan or Minsei Dōmei, the youth wing of the Japanese Communist Party
 The Constitutional Democratic Party (Japan) or Rikken Minseitō, a liberal political party in the pre-war Empire of Japan
 The Good Governance Party or Minseitō, a centrist political party founded in 1998 and merged into the Democratic Party of Japan

Firms
 UD Trucks, a manufacturer of vehicles formerly known as Minsei Diesel Industries
 Toyota Boshoku, an automotive component manufacturer formerly known as Minsei Spinning Co.